Crematogaster bingo is a species of ant in tribe Crematogastrini. It was described by Forel in 1908.

References

binghamii
Insects described in 1908